Clemence Annie Housman (23 November 1861 – 6 December 1955) was an author, illustrator and activist in the women's suffrage movement. She was the sister of A. E. Housman and Laurence Housman. Her novels included The Were-Wolf, Unknown Sea and The Life of Sir Aglovale De Galis. She was also a leading figure in the suffragette movement.

Life

Clemence was born in Bromsgrove, Worcestershire. She went to the South London School of Technical Art in 1883 where she learned, among other things, wood-engraving. She worked for a time as an engraver for illustrated papers such as The Graphic. In 1908 she subscribed to the Women's Social and Political Union, and in 1909 she was a co-founder, with her brother Laurence Housman, of the Suffrage Atelier. She made banners for the suffrage movement between 1908 and 1914.

In 1910 she became a member of the committee of the Women's Tax Resistance League. She was arrested on 30 September 1911 for non-payment of taxes and she was sent to Holloway Prison, but she was released after just one week following protests and demonstrations by her supporters.

She lived with her brother Laurence for much of her life. After World War I, they lived in a cottage in the village of Ashley in Hampshire, and then, in 1924, moved to Street, Somerset. She died in December 1955 aged 94.

Works

Clemence published three novels, and she illustrated some of the fantasies written by her brother Laurence. Each of Housman's novels is a "Christian fantasy", dramatising religious themes. Her first novel, The Were-wolf (1896), was an allegorical erotic fantasy featuring a female werewolf. H. P. Lovecraft said of the Were-Wolf that it "attains a high degree of gruesome tension and achieves to some extent the atmosphere of authentic folklore." Basil Copper described The Were-wolf as "a minor classic in the genre". The Life of Sir Aglovale de Galis is an Arthurian fantasy. Douglas A. Anderson has described The Life of Sir Aglovale de Galis as Housman's "supreme achievement". "The Drawn Arrow" (1923) is a short fable set in a desert kingdom.

Novels
  – illustrated by Laurence Housman.

As illustrator

 Laurence Housman, The Blue Moon (1904) – illustrations by L.H., engraved by C.H.

References

Further reading
Elizabeth Oakley, (2009), Inseparable Siblings: A Portrait of Clemence and Laurence Housman. Brewin Books.

External links
 
 
 
 

English suffragists
English tax resisters
19th-century English novelists
English fantasy writers
People from Bromsgrove
1861 births
1955 deaths
19th-century British short story writers